Julius Gregory (born May 18, 1988) is an American football wide receiver for the Fayetteville Mustangs of the National Arena League (NAL). He played college football at Shaw University.

College career
Gregory played college football at Shaw University, where he was a record setting wide receiver for the Bears. As a senior in 2010, Gregory set the single season and career records for receiving touchdowns in a season.

Professional career
Gregory went undrafted during the 2011 NFL Draft, and signed with the Carolina Force of American Indoor Football (AIF) in 2012. Late in December 2013, Gregory worked out twice for the Denver Broncos, but did not sign with the team. During the 2013 & 2014 season, Gregory played for the York Capitals, also of the AIF. Gregory was named the Co-MVP of the league in 2013 & 2014. Gregory signed with the Lehigh Valley Steelhawks of the Professional Indoor Football League (PIFL) on September 26, 2015, but was later assigned to the Tampa Bay Storm of the Arena Football League (AFL). On June 22, 2016, Gregory was traded to the Arizona Rattlers for future considerations. Gregory was assigned to the Washington Valor on January 11, 2017. On April 26, 2017, Gregory was placed on recallable reassignment. On May 8, 2017, Gregory was assigned to the Valor. On June 1, 2017, Gregory was placed on reassignment. On March 21, 2018, he was assigned to the Albany Empire. On April 7, 2018, he was placed on reassignment. On March 5, 2019, Gregory was assigned to the Columbus Destroyers. On April 13, 2019, he was placed on recallable reassignment and became a free agent. May 5, 2019 Gregory signed with the Carolina Cobras. Gregory has resigned for the 2020 & 2021 season.

On November 16, 2022, Gregory signed with the Fayetteville Mustangs of the National Arena League (NAL).

References

External links
Shaw bio

Living people
1988 births
American football wide receivers
Shaw Bears football players
Central Penn Capitals players
Lehigh Valley Steelhawks players
Tampa Bay Storm players
Players of American football from Virginia
Sportspeople from Portsmouth, Virginia
Arizona Rattlers players
Washington Valor players
Albany Empire (AFL) players
Columbus Destroyers players